United Nations Security Council Resolution 286, adopted unanimously on September 9, 1970, gravely concerned at the threat to innocent civilians from the hijacking of aircraft and other international travel, the Council appealed to all parties concerned for the immediate release of all passengers and crews without exception, held as a result of hijackings and other interference in international travel and called on state to take all possible legal measures to prevent further hijackings and interferences in international civil air travel.

The resolution was adopted without vote.

See also
 Dawson's Field hijackings
 List of United Nations Security Council Resolutions 201 to 300 (1965–1971)

References 
Text of the Resolution at undocs.org

External links
 

 0286
Counterterrorism
September 1970 events